El Manar English Girls School (M.E.G.S) is a school in El Raml Station (Mahatet El Raml), Alexandria, Egypt. It was founded in 1925 as the Scottish school in Alexandria. It includes kindergarten, primary, preparatory, and secondary sections.

The school has a theater, a gymnasium, three computer laboratories, three science laboratories, a library, two music rooms, an art room and an equipped clinic. The school has its annual bazaar and speech day. Graduates celebrate their graduation at their own Prom which is held every year.  There are playgrounds for  sport.

History of the school 

In 1968 the government founded the Cooperative Educational Institutes of National Accordance with the provisions of Law No. 317 of 1956 issuing the Cooperative Societies Act and assumed management of these schools under the supervision and control of the Ministry of Education, education. The Cooperative Association of National Institutes exercised its activities in the management of these schools until 1973.

Staff 

 School Principal: Mrs. Noha Gafar
 Primary Dept. Headmistress : Mrs. Gihan Abelsalam
 Middle Dept. Headmistress :Mrs. Aliaa Hassan
 Secondary Dept. Headmistress:Mrs. Engy Farid

See also 

 List of schools in Egypt
 Educational institutions in Alexandria
 Education in Egypt

External links 

   M.E.G.S official website

Education in Alexandria
Private schools in Alexandria
Schools in Egypt
Girls' schools in Egypt
Educational institutions established in 1925
1925 establishments in Egypt